Marian High School is a private, Catholic college preparatory school for young women located in Omaha, Nebraska, United States.  It is located in the Roman Catholic Archdiocese of Omaha.  Marian was founded in 1955 by the Servants of Mary. Its  campus is located in the north central portion of Omaha, near the junction of Military Avenue and 72nd Street.

Marian has won the U.S. Department of Education Blue Ribbon Award for Academic Excellence twice. It is the only Class A, North Central accredited college preparatory high school in the state of Nebraska for girls.  The school's athletic teams are known as the Crusaders.

Academics

Academic focus areas include science, math, languages, fine arts, social studies and religion. Marian has been a North Central Accredited college preparatory school for almost two decades. There are 37 honors courses, ten advanced placement courses and ten dual enrollment classes that allow students to proceed at a more rapid pace and/or to approach subjects in more depth. Marian is a Catholic school sponsored by the Servants of Mary and warmly welcomes students of all religious, cultural and economic backgrounds.

Marian High School is a member of:
 The National Catholic Educational Association (NCEA)
 The National Association of Secondary School Principals (NASSP)
 The Association for Supervision and Curriculum Development (ASCD)
 Women's Schools Together (WST) 
 The Nebraska School Activities Association (NSAA)

Marian is accredited by the State of Nebraska and the North Central Association Commission on Accreditation NCA as a college preparatory school.

Student activities and events
Marian High School provides numerous clubs, sports, and activities for involvement outside of the classroom.

Athletics
Marian's athletic program consists of nine Class A state-sanctioned sports: volleyball, cross country, softball, golf, basketball, track & field, swimming & diving, tennis and soccer. They have won 66 state championships in eight sports since the Nebraska School Activities Association has had sanctioned girls' sports (since 1971).

State championships

Walk-a-Thon

The Walk-A-Thon is an all-student facilitated fundraiser for the school. Participating students are responsible for collecting pledges from the community. Each student walks a certain mileage with their class based on the amount of money their class collected, on the day of Walk-A-Thon. The winner gets to pick color and field day theme first, in order of placement in the Walk-A-Thon.

Surprise Day
Surprise Day is an event planned each year by the Student Board, usually occurring early in the second semester. It involves a half-day of games and entertainment instead of scheduled classes. Students do not find out the date of Surprise Day until lunch on Surprise Day when a special announcement is made that lets students know their remaining classes for the day have been canceled and what activities they can expect. In recent years, bouncy castles, therapy dogs, face painting, and massage chairs have all been featured in the Surprise Day events.

gnimocemoH
gnimocemoH, which is "homecoming" spelled backwards, is Marian's approach to homecoming. Instead of a football game, Marian hosts a spirited faculty-versus-student volleyball game. Later that evening, students attend an informal dance where they don wacky attire and crown the neeuQ (Queen), usually known as Marian's most spirited student. The gnimocemoH dance is planned and executed by the Senior Class Officers: the student government board for the eldest class of students in the school.

Field Day
Field Day is held on the last Friday in April and is Marian's largest event of the year. Students spend the week leading up to Field Day making costumes, decorating PVC structures in an event called Walls, building mascots, learning songs, developing skits, and perfecting routines, all in anticipation of winning the coveted Field Day trophy. Students work with their graduating class and compete against the other grade years. During Field Week, building begins Monday at noon and all work must be completed by 4 p.m. Thursday. Each class picks two colors and a theme during Color Block several weeks prior to Field Day and is limited to those colors when creating all of their materials.

In early iterations of the competition, students would decorate the school's hallways (rather than PVC structures) for Walls Night. This was stopped by the local fire department for its potential fire hazards. Additionally, early versions of the competition also included a parade where students would build floats with their peers.

References

External links
Marian High School website

Girls' schools in Nebraska
Educational institutions established in 1955
Catholic secondary schools in Nebraska
High schools in Omaha, Nebraska
Roman Catholic Archdiocese of Omaha
1955 establishments in Nebraska